Jona Xiao (born May 18, 1989) is an American actress born in China.

Early life
Xiao was born in Changsha, China and moved to New York as infant, before ultimately settling in St. Louis, Missouri with her family; starting acting in middle school. Growing up, she was called 'chink' and 'yellow' and decided to be an actress to break against stereotypes. Xiao founded Career ACTivate, which specializes in helping actors jumpstart and progress their careers.

Career
Xiao was cast in Spider-Man: Homecoming in a role that she denies was initially written for an Asian-American actress. Marisa Tomei, who plays Aunt May in the film, lobbied for Xiao to be cast. Her role ended up getting cut in the final film.

In 2021, Xiao lent her voice to a younger Namaari in Raya and the Last Dragon.

Filmography

Television

Film

References

External links
 
 
 Jona Xiao on Douban
 Jona Xiao on Mtime

American film actresses
21st-century American actresses
American actresses of Chinese descent
Living people
1989 births
Actresses from Changsha
American television actresses
Actresses from St. Louis